is a text-based adventure video game developed and published by Sunsoft for the Famicom Disk System in Japan on November 20, 1986.

Plot
In the space calendar 0385, the Earth suffers from overpopulation and humans start to build space colonies. Cark, the protagonist, works for the Earth Federation's space development office. He is a brilliant engineer in space physics and is working for the Sirius third planet colony. He gets engaged to his girlfriend Mary, but they have to postpone their wedding. Five months later, Cark, accompanied by his robot Carry, decides to visit Mary and prepare the ceremony at last. But when he arrives at the space station where she is in, everything is quiet. Then a beam of light hits him. He wakes up sometimes later, inside a sort of underground graveyard, with pieces of dismantled robots surrounding him (including  from SunSoft's unreleased Nintendo Vs. Series title of the same name).

Gameplay
The player proceeds through the game by choosing from a selection of text menu commands. Like any traditional digital comic/text adventure games, a large view shows the surroundings. The bottom of the screen proposes simple action commands, like see, take or push; however, the game is entirely in Japanese (although it uses katakana exclusively). One of the original features of the game is to use real sampled sound in some places, which was very unusual for the time.

A complete English fan translation patch was released in November 2019.

Reception and legacy 

Dead Zone received a score of 23 out of 40 from Famicom Tsūshin (Famitsu).

Cark and Carry from Dead Zone have made appearances in a few games, including Nazoler Land 3 (1988), the strategy game Barcode World (1992) for Famicom (as SD characters), and the puzzle game Shanghai Musume: Mahjong Girls (2011) for iOS and Android.

References

External links
 

1986 video games
Adventure games
Famicom Disk System games
Famicom Disk System-only games
Japan-exclusive video games
Sunsoft games
Video games scored by Naoki Kodaka
Video games developed in Japan
Single-player video games